This is a list of people and subjects appearing on the cover of Time magazine in the 1980s. Time was first published in 1923. As Time became established as one of the United States' leading news magazines, an appearance on the cover of Time became an indicator of notability, fame or notoriety. Such features were accompanied by articles.

For other decades, see Lists of covers of Time magazine.

1980

January 7 – Ayatollah Khomeini, Man of the Year
January 14 – Moscow's Bold Challenge
January 21 – Grain as a Weapon: Who Wins, Who Loses
January 28 – Squeezing the Soviets
February 4 – Jimmy Carter
February 11 – Eric and Beth Heiden
February 18 – Operation Abscam: The FBI Stings Congress 
February 25 – Dan Rather
March 3 – Peter Sellers
March 10 – Ronald Reagan
March 17 – Diplomacy In Crisis 
March 24 – Jimmy Carter
March 31 – Interferon: The IF Drug for Cancer
April 7 – T.A. Wilson
April 14 – The Palestinians
April 21 – Is Capitalism Working?
April 28 – Jimmy Carter
May 5 – Jimmy Carter 
May 12 – Edmund Muskie
May 19 – Darth Vader
May 26 – Picasso 
June 2 – The Big Blowup (Mount St. Helens)
June 9 – Who'll Fight for America? The manpower Crisis 
June 16 – Help! Teacher Can't Teach
June 23 – Inside the U.S.S.R.
June 30 – Björn Borg
July 7 – Rediscovering America
July 14 – That Aching Back
July 21 – Feeling Super in Detroit (G.O.P. Convention)
July 28 – Ronald Reagan & George H. W. Bush
August 4 – Billy Carter
August 11 – Larry Hagman as J.R.
August 18 – Jimmy Carter
August 25 – Jimmy Carter 
September 1 – Poland's Angry Workers
September 8 – Thomas Murphy, Philip Caldwell & Lee Iacocca
September 15 – The U.S. Voter
September 22 – Poisoning of America: Those Toxic Chemical Wastes 
September 29 – Bear Bryant
October 6 – War in the Gulf (Iran–Iraq War)
October 13 – Jimmy Carter & Ronald Reagan
October 20 – Carl Sagan
October 27 – The Gulf: Will It Explode?
November 3 – Jimmy Carter & Ronald Reagan
November 10 – The Hostage Drama
November 17 – Ronald Reagan
November 24 – Saturn: Encounter in Space
December 1 – Jane Pauley, Gene Shalit, Willard Scott, Tom Brokaw, David Hartman, Charles Kuralt & Joan Lunden
December 8 – The Robot Revolution
December 15 – Rocky Mountain High
December 22 – John Lennon
December 29 – Lech Walesa

1981

January 5 – Ronald Reagan, Man of the Year
January 12 – Aiming High: Space Shuttle Columbia
January 19 – Reagan's Biggest Challenge: Mending the Economy
January 26 – The Hostages: Breakthrough
February 2 – The Ordeal Ends: And the Outrage Grows 
February 9 – Brooke Shields
February 16 – Margaret Thatcher
February 23 – American Renewal
March 2 – The Ax Fall: Reagan's Plan for a "New Beginning"
March 9 – Herbert Boyer
March 16 – Alexander Haig
March 23 – The Curse of Violent Crime
March 30 – How Japan Does It: The World's Toughest Competitor
April 6 – Abortion: The Battle of Life vs "Choice"
April 13 – Ronald Reagan
April 20 – Lady Diana
April 27 – Right On: Winging Into New Era (first orbital flight of NASA Space Shuttle Program)
May 4 – The Money Chase: What Business Schools Are Doing To Us
May 11 – Billy Martin
May 18 – Menachem Begin and Shimon Peres
May 25 – Terrorist's Target: Why Did They Do It? (Pope John Paul II assassination attempt)
June 1 – Heart Attacks: New Insights, New Treatments
June 8 – The Savings Revolution: Everybody wants Your Money
June 15 – Ed Koch
June 23 – Attack—and Fallout: The Target: Iraq's Reactor
June 30 – François Mitterrand
July 6 – High on Cocaine: A Drug with Status and Menace 
July 13 – Viet Nam Vets: Fighting for their Rights 
July 20 – Sandra Day O'Connor
July 27 – Caspar Weinberger
August 3 – Prince Charles & Lady Diana (wedding)
August 10 – Ice Cream: Getting Your Licks
August 17 – Winging It: Coping Without Controllers
August 24 – James Rouse
August 31 – John Irving
September 7 – Meryl Streep
September 14 – Jesse Helms
September 21 – Ronald Reagan
September 28 – We, the Jury
October 5 – Dicken's Nicholas Nickelby cast
October 12 – No Free Lunch: Cost of Entitlements
October 19 – Anwar Sadat 
October 26 – Arming the World: What Are the Limits
November 2 – The Fitness Craze: America Shapes Up
November 9 – Ronald Reagan
November 16 – Katharine Hepburn & Henry Fonda
November 23 – Paradise Lost? South Florida
November 30 – Europe's Fear and a Bold U.S. Proposal 
December 7 – Cats (a white cat)
December 14 – The President's Men: How the White House Works—And Doesn't
December 21 – Muammar Gaddafi
December 28 – Wojciech Jaruzelski

1982

January 4 – Lech Walesa, Man of the Year
January 11 – Patrick Teer, Children of War: Out of the Horror, Amazing Strength 
January 18 – Gronk! Flash! Zap!: Video Games Are Blitzing the World 
January 25 – Joe Montana
February 1 – Franklin D. Roosevelt
February 8 – Unemployment: the Biggest Worry 
February 15 – Steven Jobs
February 22 – Jaclyn Smith
March 1 – Henry Kissinger
March 8 – Paul Volcker
March 15 – Salt: A New Villain? 
March 22 – Central America: Gunship over El Salvador
March 29 – Nuclear War
April 5 – Giorgio Armani
April 12 – Jerusalem
April 19 – Falklands Crisis 
April 26 – Howard Baker
May 3 – Computer Kids
May 10 – Falklands War
May 17 – H.M.S. Sheffield
May 24 – Social Security
May 31 – Falklands D-Day
June 7 – Falklands, John Paul II & Ronald Reagan
June 14 – Gerry Cooney & Sylvester Stallone
June 21 – Israel's Blitz
June 28 – Spoils of War
July 5 – George Shultz
July 12 – American Women
July 19 – Siege of Beirut
July 26 – Ayatullah Khomeini
August 2 – Herpes
August 9 – Ted Turner
August 16 – Destroying Beirut
August 23 – James G. Watt
August 30 – Women & Fitness
September 6 – Bull market
September 13 – The Inmate Nation 
September 20 – Menachem Begin
September 27 – Lebanon Massacre
October 4 – Ariel Sharon
October 11 – Jimmy Carter
October 18 – John Updike
October 25 – Pac Men
November 1 – John DeLorean
November 8 – Catalogues
November 15 – Election Results
November 22 – Yuri Andropov
November 29 – Joseph Bernardin
December 6 – Paul Newman
December 13 – Ronald Reagan
December 20 – Miguel de la Madrid
December 27 – Missionaries (protestant Leon Dillinger in Papua New Guinea)

1983

January 3 – The Computer, Machine of the Year
January 10 – The Peril of Lending
January 17 – James Levine
January 24 – The Death Penalty
January 31 – Pershing II
February 7 – Robert Mitchum
February 14 – KGB
February 21 – Menachem Begin & Ariel Sharon
February 28 – Princess Diana
March 7 – Franklin C. Spinney
March 14 – John Paul II
March 21 – Lee Iacocca
March 28 – Tax Fraud
April 4 – Ronald Reagan
April 11 – Battling Cocaine's Grip
April 18 – Arms Control
April 25 – Claude Pepper
May 2 – Nastassja Kinski
May 9 – Reagan & Central America
May 16 – Hitler's Forged Diaries
May 23 – George Lucas
May 30 – The New Economy
June 6 – Cures for Stress 
June 13 – Los Angeles
June 20 – Margaret Thatcher
June 27 – John Paul II
July 4 – AIDS Hysteria
July 11 – IBM's John R. Opel
July 18 – David Bowie
July 25 – Americans on the Move
August 1 – Special Issue: Japan 
August 8 – William P. Clark
August 15 – Lisa Harap – Babies. What Do They Know? When Do They Know It?
August 22 – Jesse Jackson
August 29 – Daredevil Ben Colli
September 5 – Domestic Violence
September 12 – Soviets Destroy Airliner
September 19 – Reagan & U.N. Quiz Moscow 
September 26 – Deng Xiaoping
October 3 – Marines in Lebanon
October 5 – 60th Anniversary Issue
October 10 – America's Schools
October 17 – Peter Ueberroth
October 24 – Ronald Reagan
October 31 – Marines in Beirut
November 7 – Grenada and Beirut
November 14 – John F. Kennedy
November 21 – Splitting AT&T
November 28 – George Orwell
December 5 – Arms Control (Soviet walkout of the INF Treaty talks)
December 12 – The Press Under Fire
December 19 – Hafez Assad
December 26 – Music Videos

1984

January 2 – Ronald Reagan & Yuri Andropov, Men of the Year
January 9 – John Paul II & Mehmet Ali Ağca
January 16 – Africa's Troubles
January 23 – Arthur Rock
January 30 – Phil Mahre & Tamara McKinney
February 6 – Ronald Reagan
February 13 – Seabrook Nuclear Plant
February 20 – Yuri Andropov
February 27 – Konstantin Chernenko
March 5 – Martin Feldstein
March 12 – Gary Hart, Walter Mondale & John Glenn
March 19 – Michael Jackson
March 27 – Cholesterol
April 2 – Alexander Haig
April 9 – End of the Sexual Revolution
April 16 – Bill Gates
April 23 – Policy on Nicaragua
April 30 – China's New Face 
May 7 – Jesse Jackson
May 14 – Shirley MacLaine
May 21 – Olympic Turmoil
May 28 – D-Day Remembered 
June 4 – Geraldine Ferraro & Dianne Feinstein
June 11 – Mystery Behind Pain
June 18 – Walter Mondale
June 25 – Andrei A. Gromyko
July 2 – Erma Bombeck
July 9 – Shimon Peres & Yitzhak Shamir
July 16 – Democrats Launch Campaign
July 23 – Geraldine Ferraro
July 30 – Carl Lewis
August 6 – Mexico City
August 13 – Carl Lewis
August 20 – Sears & Cheryl Tiegs
August 27 – Ronald Reagan & George H. W. Bush
September 3 – Geraldine Ferraro
September 10 – Science of Conception
September 17 – Brian Mulroney
September 24 – America's Upbeat Mood
October 1 – Andrei A. Gromyko
October 8 – The Supreme Court (Warren E. Burger, John Paul Stevens, Lewis F. Powell Jr., William Rehnquist, Sandra Day O'Connor, Thurgood Marshall, William J. Brennan Jr., Byron White & Harry Blackmun)
October 15 – Crackdown on the Mafia
October 22 – Ronald Reagan, George H. W. Bush, Walter Mondale & Geraldine Ferraro
October 29 – Ronald Reagan & Walter Mondale
November 5 – New Concern with Civility
November 12 – Indira Gandhi
November 19 – Ronald Reagan
November 26 – Astronauts Rescue Satellite
December 3 – America's Banks
December 10 – William DeVries
December 17 – Disaster Strikes Bhopal
December 24 – Video Cassette Recorders
December 31 – David Lean

1985

January 7 – Peter Ueberroth, Man of the Year
January 14 – Nancy Reagan
January 21 – Donald Regan
January 28 – Ronald Reagan's Second Term
February 4 – John Paul II
February 11 – Soviet Defector Tells All 
February 18 – Failing Farms
February 25 – Cocaine Wars
March 4 – T. Boone Pickens
March 11 – Star Wars program
March 18 – Larry Bird & Wayne Gretzky
March 25 – Mikhail Gorbachev
April 1 – Lee Iacocca
April 8 – Bernhard Goetz
April 15 – Vietnam, a Decade Later
April 22 – U.S. Tourists
April 29 – V. E. Day: 40th Anniversary
May 6 – New Theory on Dinosaurs
May 13 – Ronald Reagan
May 20 – New Drinking Habits
May 27 – Madonna
June 3 – Nuclear Threat
June 10 – Ronald Reagan's Tax Package
June 17 – Spy Scandal Grows
June 24 – Hijacked: TWA Flight 847
July 1 – Terrorism (Captain John Testrake & a hijacker)
July 8 – Special Issue: Immigrants
July 15 – Steven Spielberg
July 22 – Ronald Reagan Enters Hospital
July 29 – Hiroshima
August 5 – South Africa
August 12 – Growing Threat of AIDS 
August 19 – Pete Rose 
August 26 – American Food
September 2 – Jerry Falwell
September 9 – Mikhail Gorbachev 
September 16 – Philip Michael Thomas & Don Johnson
September 23 – Deng Xiaoping
September 30 – Earthquake Shatters Mexico
October 7 – Trade Wars: Congress v. Ronald Reagan 
October 14 – Toxic Waste
October 21 – U.S. Strikes Back at Terrorism (EgyptAir Flight 648)
October 28 – Ronald Reagan, Hosni Mubarak, Bettino Craxi & Yasser Arafat
November 4 – Garrison Keillor
November 11 – Prince Charles & Princess Diana
November 18 – Ronald Reagan & Mikhail Gorbachev
November 25 – Volcano Strikes Colombia
December 2 – Ronald Reagan & Mikhail Gorbachev
December 9 – Teenage Pregnancy 
December 16 – Halley's Comet
December 23 – Corporate Mergers
December 30 – Christmas in Brooklyn

1986

January 6 – Deng Xiaoping, Man of the Year
January 13 – Donald Burr 
January 20 – Shedding Weight
January 27 – William Perry & Walter Payton
February 3 – Corazon Aquino & Ferdinand Marcos
February 10 – Challenger Explodes
February 17 – Pat Robertson
February 24 – Corazon Aquino
March 3 – Michael Deaver
March 10 – Corazon Aquino & Salvador Laurel
March 17 – Drugs at Work
March 24 – Insurance
March 31 – Daniel Ortega
April 7 – Dwight Gooden
April 14 – Cheap Oil
April 21 – Muammar Gaddafi
April 28 – Tripoli Under Attack
May 5 – Vladimir Horowitz
May 12 – Chernobyl Reactor
May 19 – Baby Boomers
May 26 – Molly Ringwald
June 2 – Mario Cuomo
June 9 – Fixing NASA 
June 16 – Special Issue: Best of America
June 23 – Star Wars program
June 30 – William Rehnquist
July 7 – Ronald Reagan
July 14 – Statue of Liberty
July 21 – Fighting Pornography 
July 28 – Sigourney Weaver
August 4 – Sanctions against South Africa
August 11 – Alvin Explores Titanic
August 18 – Andrew Wyeth's 'Helga'
August 25 – Tax Reform
September 1 – Ralph Lauren
September 8 – Derek Bok
September 15 – Crusade Against Drugs 
September 22 – Laurence Tisch
September 29 – John Gotti
October 6 – Stephen King
October 13 – Summit in Iceland
October 20 – Ronald Reagan & Mikhail Gorbachev
October 27 – David Byrne
November 3 – Viruses 
November 10 – High-Tech Wall Street 
November 17 – Ronald Reagan's Secret Dealings With Iran (Akbar Hashemi Rafsanjani)
November 24 – Sex Education
December 1 – Ivan Boesky
December 8 – Iran Arms Sales
December 15 – Neil Simon
December 22 – Oliver North
December 29 – Letter to the Year 2086

1987

January 5 – Corazon Aquino, Woman of the Year
January 12 – Air Travel 
January 19 – Adnan Khashoggi
January 26 – Oliver Stone's 'Platoon' (Willem Dafoe, Charlie Sheen & Tom Berenger)
February 2 – The American Consumer
February 9 – Dennis Conner
February 16 – Homosexuals & AIDS
February 23 – African Wildlife
March 2 – Bette Midler
March 9 – Ronald Reagan
March 16 – Howard Baker, William Webster & Frank Carlucci
March 23 – The Nature of the Universe (SN 1987A supernova)
March 30 – America's Agenda
April 6 – Jimmy Swaggart and Jim & Tammy Bakkers
April 13 – U.S. & Japan Face Off
April 20 – Espionage Scandals
April 27 – U2 (The Edge, Adam Clayton, Bono & Larry Mullen Jr.)
May 4 – South Africa
May 11 – Superconductors 
May 18 – Gary Hart & Donna Rice
May 25 – America's Moral Bearings 
June 1 – The 'U.S.S. Stark'
June 8 – A Memoir of the Cultural Revolution
June 15 – Alan Greenspan
June 22 – Child Care
June 29 – Chun Doo Hwan
July 6 – Special Issue: Constitution at 200
July 13 – Oliver North
July 20 – Oliver North
July 27 – Mikhail Gorbachev
August 3 – The Bakkers' Empire
August 10 – America's Vanishing Coastline 
August 17 – Ayatullah Khomeini
August 24 – Steve Martin
August 31 – Asian-American Whiz Kids
September 7 – U.S. Catholics
September 14 – America for Sale
September 21 – Robert Bork
September 28 – Bill Cosby
October 5 – Soviet Space Program (Energia rocket)
October 12 – Hite Report
October 19 – Greenhouse Effect
October 26 – Changing U.S.S.R.
November 2 – The Stock Market Crash
November 9 – America's Leadership Crisis
November 16 – Glenn Close & Michael Douglas
November 23 – Reinvigorating the City 
November 30 – Alcoholism
December 7 – Shirley MacLaine 
December 14 – Mikhail Gorbachev
December 21 – Famine in Ethiopia
December 28 – Gary Hart

1988

January 4 – Mikhail Gorbachev, Man of the Year
January 11 – 1968
January 18 – Andrew Lloyd Webber
January 25 – Iowa Primary 
February 1 – Principal Joe Clark
February 8 – Dan Rather
February 15 – Debi Thomas
February 22 – Americans Are Living Longer
February 29 – The Presidential Pack (Michael Dukakis, Dick Gephardt, Bob Dole, George H. W. Bush, Pat Robertson, Jesse Jackson, Jack Kemp & Al Gore)
March 7 – Manuel Noriega
March 14 – Superman at 50
March 21 – George H. W. Bush
March 28 – Computers of the Future
April 4 – Israel at 40
April 11 – Jesse Jackson
April 18 – War Over Smoking
April 25 – Michael Eisner & Mickey Mouse
May 2 – Michael Dukakis
May 9 – Kids Who Sell Crack
May 16 – Nancy Reagan & Astrology (from Donald Regan's memoirs)
May 23 – The Immune System
May 30 – Legalizing Drugs
June 6 – Raisa Gorbacheva
June 13 – Ronald Reagan & Mikhail Gorbachev
June 20 – Gardening
June 27 – Mike Tyson
July 4 – Drought
July 11 – Edward James Olmos
July 18 – Exploring Mars
July 25 – Lloyd Bentsen & Michael Dukakis
August 1 – Ocean Pollution
August 8 – Growing Up In America
August 15 – Mosaic of Christ
August 22 – George H. W. Bush
August 29 – George H. W. Bush & Dan Quayle
September 5 – Begging in America
September 12 – Gridlock
September 19 – Jackie Joyner-Kersee
September 26 – Computer Viruses
October 3 – John Sasso & James Baker
October 10 – U.S. Returns to Space
October 17 – Networks Under Fire
October 24 – Politics of Personality
October 31 – Clawsons of Ohio & Fernald Feed Materials Production Center
November 7 – Enrique Camarena
November 14 – Teacher Carol Bowen
November 21 – George H. W. Bush
November 28 – J.F.K.'s Assassination
December 5 – Ross Johnson
December 12 – Good News for the Heart
December 19 – Ronald Reagan, George H. W. Bush & Mikhail Gorbachev
December 26 – Yasser Arafat

1989

January 2 – Endangered Earth, Planet of the Year
January 9 – Gene Hackman & Willem Dafoe
January 16 – Donald Trump
January 23 – Barbara Bush
January 30 – George H. W. Bush
February 6 – Guns & Violence
February 13 – James Baker
February 20 – Marine Spy Scandal
February 27 – Ayatullah Khomeini
March 6 – John Tower
March 13 – Middle-Class Blacks
March 20 – Mapping Human Genes 
March 27 – Poisoned Grapes
April 3 – Student Athletes & Education
April 10 – Changing U.S.S.R.
April 17 – Alaska: America's Last Frontier
April 24 – America's Rat Race
May 1 – Abortion & The Court
May 8 – Cold Fusion? (Martin Fleischmann & Stanley Pons)
May 15 – Eduard Shevardnadze
May 22 – Panama's Election (Guillermo Ford attacked by a member of the Dignity Battalions)
May 29 – Chinese Demonstrator
June 5 – Protests in Beijing & Moscow
June 12 – Massacre in Beijing
June 19 – Revolt Against Communism
June 26 – Kevin Costner
July 3 – The Sun
July 10 – Pete Rose
July 17 – Gun Deaths (photo of Tawanah Jean Griggs)
July 24 – Joseph Hazelwood
July 31 – Doctors & Patients 
August 7 – Diane Sawyer
August 14 – Joseph Cicippio, William R. Higgins, Terry Waite & Other Hostages
August 21 – George H. W. Bush
August 28 – 50th Anniversary of World War II
September 5 – The Rolling Stones
September 11 – Citizens Fight Drugs (Rantine McKesson)
September 18 – Saving the Rain Forest 
September 25 – Atlantic City
October 2 – A Day in the Life of China
October 9 – Adoption
October 16 – The Ivory Trail
October 23 – George Washington
October 25 – 150 Years of Photojournalism 
October 30 – San Francisco Earthquake
November 6 – Eastern Europe Breaks Away
November 13 – Arsenio Hall
November 20 – The Berlin Wall
November 27 – Skyrocketing Art Prices (Pablo Picasso's Au Lapin Agile)
December 4 – A Future for Feminism?
December 11 – George H. W. Bush & Mikhail Gorbachev
December 18 – Money Laundering
December 25 – Tom Cruise

References
 Time cover search
 Time The Vault

Time magazine (1980s)
1980s
Cover of Time magazine